The flag of the United Nations consists of the emblem depicting the white azimuthal equidistant projection of the world map, centred on the North Pole, with two white olive branches placed on to its right and left, located on the sky blue background. The emblem was officially adopted on 7 December 1946, and the flag, on 20 October 1947.

Design

The flag of the United Nations consists of the white emblem on the sky blue background. The emblem depicts a azimuthal equidistant projection of the world map, centred on the North Pole, with the globe being bisected in the centre by the Prime meridian and the International Date Line, thus ensuring that no country is at prominence within the flag. The projection of the map extends to 60 degrees south latitude, and includes five concentric circles. The map is inscribed in a wreath consisting of crossed conventionalized branches of the olive tree.

The size of the emblem on the flag is one half the width of the flag itself. The flag proportions of the aspect ratio of the flag height to its width, are equal 2:3, 3:5 or to the same proportions as the national flag of any country in which the UN flag is flown. White and blue are the official colours of the United Nations. The light blue background colour code is Pantone Matching System 2925. It approximates sky blue.

The olive branches are a symbol for peace, and the world map represents all the people and the countries of the world.

History

The organizers of the 1945 United Nations Conference on International Organization in San Francisco, California wanted an insignia that could be made into a pin to identify delegates. United States Secretary of State Edward Stettinius, Jr. was chairperson of the U.S. delegation, and realized that a temporary design might become the permanent symbol of the United Nations. He formed a committee headed by Oliver Lundquist that developed a design consisting of a world map surrounded by leaves from a design created by Donal McLaughlin.

McLaughlin had previously worked as chief of graphics for the Office of Strategic Services that preceded the CIA. The azimuthal equidistant projection used in his design was heavily influenced by the maps created during World War II by Richard Edes Harrison, a popular cartographer working for Fortune and Life..

The blue that appears in the background of the insignia was chosen to be "the opposite of red, the war colour", although the exact shade has never been officially specified by the United Nations. The original colour the group chose in 1945 was a gray blue that differs from the current United Nations flag. The globe used in the original design was an azimuthal projection focused on the North Pole with the United States, the host nation of the conference, at the centre. The projection that was used cut off portions of the Southern Hemisphere at the latitude of Argentina, which was acceptable at the time, as Argentina was not planned to be an original member of the United Nations. The projection was later altered so that no country will be at prominence within the flag. The new logo was now designed so that the globe is bisected in the centre by the Prime Meridian and the International Date Line. The earlier version of the emblem had the globe 90 degrees turned eastward compared with the present flag, which has the Prime Meridian and the International Date Line forming the vertical diameter. According to press statements, the change was made to move North America away from the centre of the emblem.

In 1946, a UNO committee got the task of making a definite design, which was presented 2 December 1946. The emblem was adopted by the plenary session of the UNO on 7 December 1946, and the flag was officially adopted on 20 October 1947.

Use
According to the Convention on the Safety of United Nations and Associated Personnel, the emblem and the flag of the United Nations can be used by the personnel and material of UN peacekeeping missions as a protective sign to prevent attacks during an armed conflict.

The United Nations flag may also be flown as a garrison flag with other country flags. Garrison size is 10 feet by 30 feet.

Derived flags

Agencies and organizations

===National flags===
The UN flag is the origin of a family of national flags. Because of the UN's association with peace and cooperation, UN-inspired flags are often adopted by nations experiencing conflict or instability. Many nations with UN-inspired flags either were or were a part of United Nations trust territories.

Usage outside the UN 
 The UN flag is depicted in the background of former UN Secretary-General Dag Hammarskjöld on Sweden's 1,000 SEK banknote, the currency's highest denomination. The banknotes have been in circulation since October 2015.

See also 
 Flag of Earth

Notes

References

External links 

 UN Flag Code, 20 November 2020
 United Nations Flag Code
 

United Nations
United Nations
United Nations